Flock of Four is a 2018 American adventure comedy-drama film directed by Gregory Caruso and featuring Reg E. Cathey.  It is based on Caruso's short film of the same name.

Cast
Braeden Lemasters
Uriah Shelton
Isaac Jay
Dylan Riley Snyder
Reg E. Cathey
Shane Harper
Coco Jones
Nadji Jeter
Connor Paolo
Gatlin Green

Reception
The film has  rating on Rotten Tomatoes.  Hunter Lanier of Film Threat awarded the film four stars out of five.

The Hollywood Reporter gave the film a positive review, calling it "A deeply earnest attempt to reconcile an old question of race and heritage."

Robert Abele of the Los Angeles Times gave it a negative review and wrote "Though every location is photographed with an almost stately reverence, it is, yes, another mini-odyssey of black history through white eyes..."

References

External links
 
 

2010s adventure comedy-drama films
American adventure comedy-drama films
Features based on short films
2018 comedy-drama films
2010s English-language films
2010s American films